Talis wockei is a moth in the family Crambidae described by Ivan Nikolayevich Filipjev in 1929. It is found in Russia (southern Siberia), Mongolia and China (Kansu, Shantung).

References

Ancylolomiini
Moths described in 1929
Moths of Asia